The Minister for Fisheries was a minister in the New South Wales Government with responsibility for the administration and management of oyster farms and fisheries in New South Wales, Australia.

It was created in 1981 in the fourth Wran ministry as the Minister for Agriculture and Fisheries and the portfolio was commonly combined with that of Agriculture. Prior to 1981 fisheries had been part of the responsibilities of the Minister for Conservation.

The portfolio was abolished in 2004 in the fourth Carr ministry with the portfolio renamed Primary Industries.

List of ministers

See also 

List of New South Wales government agencies

References

Fisheries
New South Wales